The International Society for Biosemiotic Studies (ISBS) is an academic society for the researchers in semiotic biology. The Society was established in 2005. Its official journal is Biosemiotics, published by Springer and launched in 2008. 

The purpose of the ISBS is to constitute an organizational framework for the collaboration among scholars dedicated to biosemiotic studies, including the interdisciplinary research of sign processes in living systems, organic codes, and biocommunication. The ISBS attempts to develop the qualitative research methods in biology. Among the central focuses is also theoretical semiotics as a basis for theoretical biology.

The ISBS assures the organization of regular meetings on research into the semiotics of nature, as well as promotes publication of scholarly work on the semiotics of life processes. The ISBS organizes the annual international conferences (Gatherings in Biosemiotics) that were started by Copenhagen and Tartu biosemioticians and have taken place regularly already since 2001.

The first President of the ISBS was Jesper Hoffmeyer (Copenhagen University), the second President (since 2015) is Kalevi Kull.

References

External links
Homepage of the International Society for Biosemiotic Studies
Biosemiotics, the official journal of the Society

International scientific organizations
Biology organizations
Semiotics organizations